Mary Hinton may refer to:
 Mary Hinton (academic), American academic and university administrator
 Mary Hinton (actress), British actress
 Mary Hilliard Hinton, American painter, historian, and anti-suffragist